Celebrity Show-Off is a nine-episode American reality competition television series that premiered on TBS on June 23, 2020, and airs on Tuesdays at 10 pm. The remotely-produced program—which is hosted by Mayim Bialik and based on the South Korean show My Little Television—features five celebrities per episode competing to create popular original content. Each celebrity's "digital show" is uploaded to TBS' YouTube channel the day after each episode airs and later receives a score based on its viewership, view duration, and engagement performance. After they react to each other's videos in a virtual studio, the celebrity with the lowest-performing is eliminated, and a new competitor will be introduced.

Diplo, Ja Rule, Action Bronson, Gabi Butler, Dwight Howard, Travis Kelce, NeNe Leakes, Jason Mraz, Kevin Smith, Tori Spelling, Bella Thorne, Rumer Willis, Scout Willis, and Tallulah Willis are among the celebrities competing. As each remains in the competition, the amount of money they raise for the charity of their choice increases, and the winner will receive an additional opportunity to donate Plus The Winner Also Receives The Celebrity Show Off Championship Belt.

Season 1 (2020)

Renewation Chart 
Color key:

Episode 1 (23 June 2020)

Episode 2 (30 June 2020)

Episode 3 (7 July 2020)

Episode 4 (14 July 2020)

Episode 5 (21 July 2020)

Episode 6 (28 July 2020)

Episode 7 (4 August 2020)

Episode 8 (11 August 2020)

Episode 9 (18 August 2020)

Viewership and ratings

References

External links
 

2020 American television series debuts
2020 American television series endings
2020s American reality television series
2020s American game shows
American television series based on South Korean television series
Celebrity reality television series
English-language television shows
TBS (American TV channel) original programming
Television series impacted by the COVID-19 pandemic